College Democrats are organizations on many college campuses, working to elect Democratic Party candidates and provide networking and leadership opportunities for student members. The chapters have served as a way for college students to connect with the Democratic Party and Democratic campaigns, and has produced many prominent liberal and progressive activists.

Many of these chapters are organized under the College Democrats of America, the official youth outreach arm of the Democratic National Committee, which claims over 100,000 college and university student members from across the United States. Other chapters are organized under the Young Democrats of America and its College Caucus.

Activities

Immediately leading up to election day, chapters are expected to participate in get out the vote (GOTV) activities, both on-campus and in surrounding communities.

Other activities are not centrally determined, and thus vary from chapter to chapter. Typical activities might include inviting guest speakers (often elected officials or party activists) to campus, organizing issue advocacy and lobbying efforts (like letter-writing campaigns or phone banks), and arranging service activities for members to attend.

College Democrats chapters also often organize social events (like sporting competitions with College Republicans chapters) and other recruitment activities.

During the election season, campus chapters typically partake in campaign work. These efforts generally include voter registration drives and dorm storms to register youth voters that have just gained voter eligibility. They also include providing youth manpower to campaigns for canvassing and phone banks. During presidential election years, chapters have organized proxy debates and run mock elections.

Presidential Primaries 
Many chapters of the College Democrats took part in the 2016 Democratic Primary between Secretary Hillary Clinton (D-NY) and Senator Bernie Sanders (I-VT). In the run-up to the campaign's launch, many students participated in Ready for Hillary PAC's efforts to build support for Clinton. The statewide organization in California actively supported the PAC and recruited supporters while many chapters hosted the PAC's Hillary Bus on their campuses to build support for Clinton.

Notable College Democrats

See also
 College Republicans
 Democratic Party
 Democratic National Committee
 High School Democrats of America

References

 
Democratic Party (United States) organizations
Factions in the Democratic Party (United States)
Student wings of political parties in the United States
Student organizations established in 1932